In economics, demand is the quantity of a good that consumers are willing and able to purchase at various prices during a given time. The relationship between price and quantity demand is also called the demand curve. Demand for a specific item is a function of an item's perceived necessity, price, perceived quality, convenience, available alternatives, purchasers' disposable income and tastes, and many other options.

Factors influencing demand

Innumerable factors and circumstances affect a consumer's willingness or to buy a good. Some of the common factors are:

The price of the commodity: The basic demand relationship is between potential prices of a good and the quantities that would be purchased at those prices. Generally, the relationship is negative, meaning that an increase in price will induce a decrease in the quantity demanded. This negative relationship is embodied in the downward slope of the consumer demand curve. The assumption of a negative relationship is reasonable and intuitive. For example, if the price of a gallon of milk were to rise from $5 to a price of $15, that would be a big price increase. Such a significant price increase causes the consumer to demand less of that product at the price of $15 because not only is it more expensive, but the new price is very unreasonable for a gallon of milk.

Price of related goods: The principal related goods are complements and substitutes. A complement is a good that is used with the primary good. Examples include hotdogs and mustard, beer and pretzels, automobiles and gasoline. (Perfect complements behave as a single good.) If the price of the complement goes up, the quantity demanded of the other good goes down.

Mathematically, the variable representing the price of the complementary good would have a negative coefficient in the demand function. For example, Qd = a - P - Pg where Q is the quantity of automobiles demanded, P is the price of automobiles and Pg is the price of gasoline. The other main category of related goods are substitutes. Substitutes are goods that can be used in place of the primary good. The mathematical relationship between the price of the substitute and the demand for the good in question is positive. If the price of the substitute goes down the demand for the good in question goes down.

Personal Disposable Income: In most cases, the more disposable income (income after tax and receipt of benefits) a person has, the more likely that person is to buy.

Tastes or preferences: The greater the desire to own a good the more likely one is to buy the good. There is a basic distinction between desire and demand. Desire is a measure of the willingness to buy a good based on its intrinsic qualities. Demand is the willingness and ability to put one's desires into effect. It is assumed that tastes and preferences are relatively constant.

Consumer expectations about future prices, income and availability: If a consumer believes that the price of the good will be higher in the future, he/she is more likely to purchase the good now. If the consumer expects that his/her income will be higher in the future, the consumer may buy the good now. Availability (supply side) as well as predicted or expected availability also affects both price and demand.

Population: If the population grows this means that demand will also increase.

This list is not exhaustive. All facts and circumstances that a buyer finds relevant to his willingness or ability to buy goods can affect demand. For example, a person caught in an unexpected storm is more likely to buy an umbrella than if the weather were bright and sunny.

The number of consumers in a market: The market demand for a good is obtained by adding individual demands of the present, as well as prospective consumers of a good at various possible prices. The larger the consumer-base is for a good, the greater the market demand for it.

Demand function equation and curve
The demand equation is the mathematical expression of the relationship between the quantity of a good demanded and those factors that affect the willingness and ability of a consumer to buy the good. For example, Qd = f(P; Prg, Y) is a demand equation where Qd is the quantity of a good demanded, P is the price of the good, Prg is the price of a related good, and Y is income; the function on the right side of the equation is called the demand function. The semi-colon in the list of arguments in the demand function means that the variables to the right are being held constant as one plots the demand curve in (quantity, price) space. A simple example of a demand equation is Qd = 325 - P - 30Prg + 1.4Y. Here 325 is the repository of all relevant non-specified factors that affect demand for the product. P is the price of the good. The coefficient is negative in accordance with the law of demand. The related good may be either a complement or a substitute. If it is a complement, the coefficient of its price would be negative as in this example. If it is a substitute, the coefficient of its price would be positive. Income (Y), has a positive coefficient, indicating that the good is a normal good. If the coefficient were negative, the good would be an inferior good meaning that the demand for the good would fall as the consumer's income has increased. Specifying values for the non-price determinants, Prg = 4.00 and Y = 50, results in demand equation Q = 325 - P - 30(4) +1.4(50) or Q = 275 - P. If income were to increase to 55, the new demand equation would be Q = 282 - P. Graphically, this change in a non-price determinant of demand would be reflected in an outward shift of the demand function caused by a change in the x-intercept.

Demand curve

In economics the demand curve is the graphical representation of the relationship between the price and the quantity that consumers are willing to purchase. The curve shows how the price of a commodity or service changes as the quantity demanded increases. Every point on the curve is an amount of consumer demand and the corresponding market price. The graph shows the law of demand, which states that people will buy less of something if the price goes up and vice versa.
According to Kotler, eight demand states are possible:
 Negative demand — Consumers dislike the product and may even pay to avoid it.
 Nonexistent demand — Consumers may be unaware of or uninterested in the product.
 Latent demand — Consumers may share a strong need that cannot be satisfied by an existing product.
 Declining demand — Consumers begin to buy the product less frequently or not at all.
 Irregular demand — Consumer purchases vary on a seasonal, monthly, weekly, daily, or even hourly basis.
 Full demand — Consumers are adequately buying all products put into the marketplace.
 Overfull demand — More consumers would like to buy the product than can be satisfied.
 Unwholesome demand — Consumers may be attracted to products that have undesirable social consequences.

Price elasticity of demand

The price elasticity of demand is a measure of the sensitivity of the quantity variable, Q, to changes in the price variable, P. It shows the percent by which the quantity demanded will change as a result of a given percentage change in the price. Thus, a demand elasticity of -2 says that the quantity demanded will fall 2% if the price rises 1%. For infinitesimal changes, the elasticity is (∂Q/∂P)×(P/Q).

Elasticity along linear demand curve
The slope of a linear demand curve is constant. The elasticity of demand changes continuously as one moves down the demand curve because the ratio of price to quantity continuously falls. At the point the demand curve intersects the y-axis, demand becomes infinitely elastic, because the variable Q appearing in the denominator of the elasticity formula is zero. At the point the demand curve intersects the x-axis, the elasticity is zero, because the variable P appearing in the numerator of the elasticity formula is zero. At one point on a linear demand curve, demand is unitary elastic: an elasticity of one. For higher prices, the elasticity is greater than 1 in magnitude: demand is said to be elastic because percentage quantity changes are bigger than price changes. For prices below the point of unit elasticity, the elasticity is less than 1 and demand is said to be inelastic.

Constant price elasticity demand
Constant elasticity of demand occurs when  where a and c are parameters, and the constant price elasticity is

Perfectly inelastic demand
Perfectly inelastic demand is represented by a vertical demand curve. Under perfect price inelasticity of demand, the price has no effect on the quantity demanded. The demand for the good remains the same regardless of how low or high the price. Goods with (nearly) perfectly inelastic demand are typically goods with no substitutes. For instance, insulin is nearly perfectly inelastic. Diabetics need insulin to survive so a change in price would not effect the quantity demanded. Insulin is not perfectly inelastic, however, as a prohibitively high price would cause some individuals to be incapable of purchasing insulin entirely. On the other hand, if insulin was sold at a very low price, it is possible that some individuals would purchase more insulin if they were not able to afford it before. Because of the effects of extreme pricing, no good can be considered truly perfectly inelastic.

Market structure and the demand curve
In perfectly competitive markets the demand curve, the average revenue curve, and the marginal revenue curve all coincide and are horizontal at the market-given price. The demand curve is perfectly elastic and coincides with the average and marginal revenue curves. Economic actors are price-takers. Perfectly competitive firms have zero market power; that is, they have no ability to affect the terms and conditions of exchange. A perfectly competitive firm's decisions are limited to whether to produce and if so, how much. In less than perfectly competitive markets the demand curve is negatively sloped and there is a separate marginal revenue curve. A firm in a less than perfectly competitive market is a price-setter. The firm can decide how much to produce or what price to charge. In deciding one variable the firm is necessarily determining the other variable

Inverse demand function

In its standard form a linear demand equation is Q = a - bP. That is, quantity demanded is a function of price. The inverse demand equation, or price equation, treats price as a function f of quantity demanded: P = f(Q). To compute the inverse demand equation, simply solve for P from the demand equation. For example, if the demand equation is Q = 240 - 2P then the inverse demand equation would be P = 120 - .5Q, the right side of which is the inverse demand function.

The inverse demand function is useful in deriving the total and marginal revenue functions. Total revenue equals price, P, times quantity, Q, or TR = P×Q. Multiply the inverse demand function by Q to derive the total revenue function: TR = (120 - .5Q) × Q = 120Q - 0.5Q². The marginal revenue function is the first derivative of the total revenue function; here MR = 120 - Q. Note that the MR function has the same y-intercept as the inverse demand function in this linear example; the x-intercept of the MR function is one-half the value of that of the demand function, and the slope of the MR function is twice that of the inverse demand function. This relationship holds true for all linear demand equations. The importance of being able to quickly calculate MR is that the profit-maximizing condition for firms regardless of market structure is to produce where marginal revenue equals marginal cost (MC). To derive MC the first derivative of the total cost function is taken. For example, assume cost, C, equals 420 + 60Q + Q2. Then MC = 60 + 2Q. Equating MR to MC and solving for Q gives Q = 20. So 20 is the profit maximizing quantity: to find the profit-maximizing price simply plug the value of Q into the inverse demand equation and solve for P.

Residual demand curve
The demand curve facing a particular firm is called the residual demand curve. The residual demand curve is the market demand that is not met by other firms in the industry at a given price. The residual demand curve is the market demand curve D(p), minus the supply of other organizations, So(p):
Dr(p) = D(p) - So(p)

Demand function and total revenue
If the demand curve is linear, then it has the form: p = a - b*q, where p is the price of the good and q is the quantity demanded. The intercept of the curve and the vertical axis is represented by a, meaning the price when no quantity demanded. and b is the slope of the demand function. If the demand function has the form like that, then the Total Revenue should equal quantity demanded times the price of the good, which can be represented by: TR= q*p = q(a-bq).

Is the demand curve for PC firm really flat?
Practically every introductory microeconomics text describes the demand curve facing a perfectly competitive firm as being flat or horizontal. A horizontal demand curve is perfectly elastic. If there are n identical firms in the market then the elasticity of demand PED facing any one firm is
 PEDmi = nPEDm - (n - 1) PES
where PEDm is the market elasticity of demand, PES is the elasticity of supply of each of the other firms, and (n -1) is the number of other firms. This formula suggests two things. The demand curve is not perfectly elastic and if there are a large number of firms in the industry the elasticity of demand for any individual firm will be extremely high and the demand curve facing the firm will be nearly flat.

For example, assume that there are 80 firms in the industry and that the demand elasticity for industry is -1.0 and the price elasticity of supply is 3. Then
 PEDmi = (80 x (-1)) - (79 x 3) = -80 - 237 = -317

That is the firm PED is 317 times as elastic as the market PED. If a firm raised its price "by one tenth of one percent demand would drop by nearly one third." if the firm raised its price by three tenths of one percent the quantity demanded would drop by nearly 100%. Three tenths of one percent marks the effective range of pricing power the firm has because any attempt to raise prices by a higher percentage will effectively reduce quantity demanded to zero.

Demand management in economics
Demand management in economics is the art or science of controlling economic or aggregate demand to avoid a recession. Such management is inspired by Keynesian macroeconomics, and Keynesian economics is sometimes referred to as demand-side economics.

Demand management has a defined set of processes, capabilities and recommended behaviors for companies that produce goods and services. Consumer electronics and goods companies often lead in the application of demand management practices to their demand chains; demand management outcomes are a reflection of policies and programs to influence demand as well as competition and options available to users and consumers. Effective demand management follows the concept of a "closed loop" where feedback from the results of the demand plans is fed back into the planning process to improve the predictability of outcomes. Many practices reflect elements of systems dynamics. Volatility is being recognized as significant an issue as the focus on variance of demand to plans and forecasts.

Different types of goods demand
Negative demand: If the market response to a product is negative, it shows that people are not aware of the features of the service and the benefits offered. Under such circumstances, the marketing unit of a service firm has to understand the psyche of the potential buyers and find out the prime reason for the rejection of the service. For example: if passengers refuse a bus conductor's call to board the bus. The service firm has to come up with an appropriate strategy to remove the misunderstandings of the potential buyers. A strategy needs to be designed to transform the negative demand into a positive demand.

No demand: If people are unaware, have insufficient information about a service or due to the consumer's indifference this type of a demand situation could occur. The marketing unit of the firm should focus on promotional campaigns and communicating reasons for potential customers to use the firm's services. Service differentiation is one of the popular strategies used to compete in a no demand situation in the market.

Latent demand: At any given time it is impossible to have a set of services that offer total satisfaction to all the needs and wants of society. In the market there exists a gap between desirables and the availables. There is always a search on for better and newer offers to fill the gap between desirability and availability. Latent demand is a phenomenon of any economy at any given time, it should be looked upon as a business opportunity by service firms and they should orient themselves to identify and exploit such opportunities at the right time. For example, a passenger traveling in an ordinary bus dreams of traveling in a luxury bus. Therefore, latent demand is nothing but the gap between desirability and availability.

Seasonal demand: Some services do not have a year-round demand, and might be required only at a certain period of time. Seasons all over the world are diverse. Seasonal demands create many problems for service organizations, such as idling the capacity, fixed cost and excess expenditure on marketing and promotions. Strategies used by firms to overcome this may include nurturing the service consumption habit of customers so as to make the demand unseasonal, or recognizing markets elsewhere in the world during the off-season period. Hence, this presents an opportunity to target different markets with the appropriate season in different parts of the world. For example, the need for Christmas cards comes around once a year.

Demand patterns need to be studied in different segments of the market. Service organizations need to constantly study changing demands related to their service offerings over various time periods. They have to develop a system to chart these demand fluctuations, which helps them in predicting the demand cycles. Demands do fluctuate randomly; therefore, they should be followed on a daily, weekly or monthly basis.

Criticism
E. F. Schumacher challenges the prevailing economic assumption that fulfilling demand is the purpose of economic activity, offering a framework of what he calls "Buddhist economics" in which wise demands, fulfilling genuine human needs, are distinguished from unwise demands, arising from the five intellectual impairments recognized by Buddhism:

Demand reduction

In psychopharmacology 

Demand reduction refers to efforts aimed at reducing the public desire for illegal and illicit drugs. The drug policy is in contrast to the reduction of drug supply, but the two policies are often implemented together.

In energy conservation 

Energy demand management, also known as demand-side management (DSM) or demand-side response (DSR), is the modification of consumer demand for energy through various methods such as financial incentives and behavioral change through education.

See also

 Consumption
 Demand chain
 Demand curve
 Demand-led growth
 Derived demand
 Law of demand
 Price–performance ratio
 Production (economics)
 Law of supply
 Planned obsolescence
 Supply (economics)
 Supply-side economics
 Supply and demand
 Utility

Notes

Further reading
 

 
Consumer theory